Hidayet Bayraktar (born 25 March 1962, in Nicosia) is a Turkish diplomat and incumbent ambassador of Turkey to Nigeria.

He graduated from Ankara University, Faculty of Political Sciences, Department of International Relations. He started his career at Turkish Ministry of Foreign Affairs in 1989 as a Candidate Career Diplomat. Hidayet was listed to serve as the Turkish Ambassador to Nigeria in December 2020. He resumed office on 16 April 2021, succeeding Ambassador Melih Ulueren. Hidayet has served as Turkish diplomat in other Turkish embassies in various capacities.

References 

1962 births
Living people
Ambassadors of Turkey to Nigeria